"Green Grass" is a song written by Roger Cook and Roger Greenaway and was recorded by Gary Lewis & the Playboys. The song reached #8 on The Billboard Hot 100 in 1966.

References

1966 singles
1966 songs
Songs written by Roger Cook (songwriter)
Songs written by Roger Greenaway
Gary Lewis & the Playboys songs
The Statler Brothers songs
The Ventures songs
Liberty Records singles